Ali Al Salem Air Base  is a military air base situated in Kuwait, approximately 23 miles (37 km) from the Iraqi border, and roughly 15 km west of Al Jahra. The airfield is owned by the Government of Kuwait, and during Operation Southern Watch, Operation Iraqi Freedom, Royal Air Force (RAF) during Operation Telic, United States Air Force (USAF), and United States Marine Corps (USMC) personnel and aircraft. Since those operations, the base has been returned to the control of the Kuwaiti Government, with the USAF continuing to maintain a presence alongside their Kuwait Air Force counterparts. The principal USAF unit on base is the 386th Air Expeditionary Wing (386 AEW).

History

Gulf War 
In 1990, the base was the last to be overrun during the Iraqi invasion of Kuwait. On August 3, Ali Al Salem was the only air base not occupied by Iraq. A small number of Kuwaiti regulars, staff officers, and the base Commander, General Saber Suwaidan  stayed to fight and organize resupply missions from Saudi Arabia. By the end of the day, Ali Al Salem had been overrun. Upon discovery by the Iraqi military, the Kuwaiti General was hanged from the base flagpole by Iraqi troops. New flagpoles have since been installed, however as of December 2012, the original pole still stands. The remaining Kuwaiti military personnel were lined up outside the old Kuwaiti officers' club and shot. While no longer used, the building and bullet holes remain.

Operation Desert Fox and Operation Telic 
The Royal Air Force operated out of Ali Al Salem from early 1998, just before Operation Desert Fox. The RAF detachment consisted of various non-formed units, and a rotating Squadron of Panavia Tornado GR1s and later Tornado GR4s. The base was rapidly expanded in early 2003 to base the Joint Helicopter Command assets prior to start of Operation Telic, the British designation for the US designated Operation Iraqi Freedom.

During the war, the RAF amalgamated five Tornado GR4 Squadrons based at AAS to form the Ali Al Salem Combat Air Wing, commanded by Wing Commander Paddy Teakle OBE (OC 31 Squadron). He was awarded the DSO for his leadership.

The RAF had relocated to Al Udeid Air Base, Qatar by 2004, though some elements remained through 2008, and it serves as a backup and emergency strip for RAF operations.

Infrastructure and facilities

Role and operations

Kuwait Air Force
The Kuwait Air Force Flight Training School is located at Ali Al Salem. The base is also home to the Air Force's attack and support helicopter squadrons.

Military intervention against ISIL 

The base currently hosts several non-Kuwaiti military units, mainly 386th AEW USAF.

Based units 
Flying and notable non-flying units based at Ali al Salem Air Base.

Kuwait Air Force 

 12th Training Squadron – Hawk Mk.64
 19th Training Squadron – Tucano Mk.52
 17th Attack Squadron – AH-64D Apache Longbow 
 20th Attack Squadron – AH-64D Apache Longbow 
 32nd Helicopter Squadron – SA 330L Puma
 33rd Helicopter Squadron – SA 342K Gazelle
 62nd Utility Squadron – AS 332M Super Puma and AS532SC Cougar
 88th Training Squadron – SA-342K Gazelle
 Typhoon Operational Conversion Unit – Typhoon

United States Air Force 
Air Combat Command

 Ninth Air Force (Air Forces Central)
 386th Air Expeditionary Wing
 386th Expeditionary Maintenance Group
 386th Expeditionary Medical Group
 386th Expeditionary Mission Support Group
 387th Air Expeditionary Group
 407th Air Expeditionary Group

Future 
Starting in 2018, expansion on the base was begun by the Kuwaiti Air Force to include a new asphalt/concrete runway and extensive new hangar facilities to support the future delivery of Eurofighters intended to replace their existing complement of F-18C fighter jets.

The base expansion was scheduled for completion in the second half of 2020, with the delivery of the 28 Eurofighters to follow starting in late 2020.

See also
 Military of Kuwait
 List of United Kingdom Military installations used during Operation Telic
 Battle of Al-Regeai
 Salem Al-Ali Al-Sabah

References

Airports in Kuwait
Military installations of the United States in Kuwait